Fiona Corke (born 24 September 1961) is an Australian actress best known for her role as Gail Robinson on the Australian soap opera Neighbours.

Career
Corke began her career with a minor role in the film 'I Live with Me Dad.' Corke appeared as a guest star in Zoo Family in 1985. She then had a role in Prisoner: Cell Block H in 1986 as Alison Mills who dated derided prison officer Rodney Adams. The role was intended to be ongoing, however, it prematurely ended when Prisoner was cancelled. Fiona then joined the cast of Grundy stable-mate Neighbours, in 1987, playing Gail Lewis/Robinson and stayed with the show until 1989.

Corke has also made guest appearances on a variety of prime time shows and had a recurring role as Trudi Dawson on the Australian Broadcasting Corporation drama SeaChange.

After Corke returned for a cameo appearance as Gail in Neighbours in 2005, she returned three more times for guest appearances in 2006, 2007 and again in 2019 for an extended guest-stint which saw the return of all of Paul Robinson's ex-wives in a plot devised by Gail and Paul's daughter Elle, played by Pippa Black.

In 2007 and 2008 Corke appeared in Rush and several episodes of City Homicide.

Personal life
Corke is married to actor and musician Nick Carrafa who also appeared in Neighbours as Tony Romeo.

Corke wrote, produced and directed her first short film Woundead which was selected for the 2009 St Kilda Film Festival.

Corke is a well-known wildlife activist and campaigner and is vice president of the Australian Society for Kangaroos, a not for profit organisation.  ASK represents Australia's iconic kangaroos who are also the victims of the world's largest wildlife slaughter for their skins and meat.

Roles
I Live with Me Dad (Nursing Sister – 1985)
Zoo Family (1985)
Prisoner (Alison Mills – 1986)
Neighbours (Gail Lewis Robinson – 1987–1989; 2005; 2006; 2007, 2019)
A Slow Night at the Kuwaiti Cafe (1992)
Cluedo (Jan Mustard – 1992)
The Man from Snowy River (Lola Hatton – 1993)
Phoenix (Dog 1 – 1993)
Gross Misconduct (Det. Coote – 1993)
Undying (Cara – 1994)
Police Rescue (Sandra – 1995)
Halifax f.p: Cradle and All (Christine – 1996)
Mercury (Karin Grunewald – 1996)
Blue Heelers (Thea Copeland – 1997)
Driven Crazy (Rhonda – 1998)
SeaChange (Trudi Dawson – 1998–2000)
Halifax f.p: The Spider and the Fly (Lisa McNamara – 2000)
The Saddle Club (Dee Marsden – 2001)
Short Cuts (Elisa Bennett – 2002)
City Homicide (Judith Wellings – 2007, 2008)

References

External links
 Fiona Corke on IMDb
 Bring Back Gail

1961 births
Australian television actresses
Living people